Silbersee  is a small lake in the Austrian state of Carinthia.

Geography
It is located near the village of Sankt Ulrich east of the Villach city centre, close to the Drava River. Its surface covers an area of 8.4 ha, its maximum depth is 7 m.

The artificial lake arose in the early 1970s during the construction of the nearby Süd Autobahn. Owned by the Villach city administration, it is today part of a publicly accessible recreation area and a popular destination for bathers as well as for ice-skaters in winter. In 1991 the lake was the site of the world water skiing championship.

External links
 Information from the Carinthian Institute of Limnology

Lakes of Carinthia (state)